Crown v. Stevens is a 1936 British crime thriller film directed by Michael Powell. It was made as a quota quickie.

Plot
Ex-dancer Doris Stevens kills a moneylender who is pressing her for settlement of her debt and threatening to tell her respectable husband. Jansen, who also owes money, sees her there but does not report her. Later, Jansen finds out the woman is his employer's wife. He later accidentally intervenes when Doris attempts to also murder her dull and stingy husband.

Cast
 Beatrix Thomson as Doris Stevens
 Patric Knowles as Chris Jensen
 Glennis Lorimer as Miss Molly Hobbes
 Reginald Purdell as Alf
 Allan Jeayes as Inspector Carter
 Frederick Piper as Arthur Stevens
 Googie Withers as Ella Levine
 Mabel Poulton as Mamie
 Morris Harvey as Maurice Bayleck (uncredited)
 Bernard Miles as Detective Wells (uncredited)

Critical reception
At the time of the film's release, Kinematograph Weekly called it a "Vivid portrayal of a young woman who commits murder and then tries to poison her husband, thereby involving his employee, a witness to the former crime. Plot is entirely suited to those who do not demand that a crime story should justify its existence by reaching too high an artistic level in theme, acting or presentation. Definitely unsuited to the family, the picture may nevertheless find a place in the average programme as a quota thriller"; while more recently, TV Guide called it "Occasionally suspenseful," though opined "the plot is soggy and the actors all wet"; whereas Dennis Schwartz noted "a very entertaining little melodrama," and concluded "The acting honors go to (Beatrix) Thomson. The stage actress was superb as the quintessential femme fatale, and easily steals this film from her capable co-stars."

References

External links
 
 
 
 
 Reviews and articles at the Powell & Pressburger Pages

British crime thriller films
1930s English-language films
Films directed by Michael Powell
Films by Powell and Pressburger
Quota quickies
1930s crime thriller films
Films shot at Teddington Studios
Films set in London
Warner Bros. films
British black-and-white films
1930s British films